Iceland participated in the Eurovision Song Contest 2006 with the song "Congratulations" written by Þorvaldur Bjarni Þorvaldsson, Ágústa Eva Erlendsdóttir and Gaukur Úlfarsson. The song was performed by Silvía Night. The Icelandic entry for the 2006 contest in Athens, Greece was selected through the national final Söngvakeppni Sjónvarpsins 2006, organised by the Icelandic broadcaster Ríkisútvarpið (RÚV). The selection consisted of three semi-finals and a final, held on 21 January, 28 January, 4 February and 18 February 2006, respectively. Eight songs competed in each semi-final with the top four as selected by a public televote alongside two jury wildcards advancing to the final. In the final, "Til hamingju Ísland" performed by Silvía Nótt emerged as the winner exclusively through public televoting. The song was later translated from Icelandic to English for the Eurovision Song Contest and was titled "Congratulations", while her stage name was changed to Silvía Night.

Iceland competed in the semi-final of the Eurovision Song Contest which took place on 18 May 2006. Performing as the closing entry during the show in position 23, "Congratulations" was not announced among the top 10 entries of the semi-final and therefore did not qualify to compete in the final. It was later revealed that Iceland placed thirteenth out of the 23 participating countries in the semi-final with 62 points.

Background 

Prior to the 2006 Contest, Iceland had participated in the Eurovision Song Contest eighteen times since its first entry in 1986. Iceland's best placing in the contest to this point was second, which it achieved in 1999 with the song "All Out of Luck" performed by Selma. Since the introduction of a semi-final to the format of the Eurovision Song Contest in 2004, Iceland has, to this point, yet to qualify to the final. In 2005, Iceland failed to qualify to the final with the song "If I Had Your Love" performed by Selma.

The Icelandic national broadcaster, Ríkisútvarpið (RÚV), broadcasts the event within Iceland and organises the selection process for the nation's entry. RÚV confirmed their intentions to participate at the 2006 Eurovision Song Contest on 12 September 2005. In 2004 and 2005, Iceland opted to internally select their entry for the Eurovision Song Contest. For 2006, RÚV announced along with their participation confirmation that a national final would be used for the first time since 2003 to select the Icelandic entry.

Before Eurovision

Söngvakeppni Sjónvarpsins 2006 
Söngvakeppni Sjónvarpsins 2006 was the national final format developed by RÚV in order to select Iceland's entry for the Eurovision Song Contest 2006. The four shows in the competition were hosted by Garðar Thór Cortes and Brynhildur Guðjónsdóttir and all took place at the Fiskislóð 45 venue in Reykjavík. The semi-finals and final were broadcast on RÚV and online at the broadcaster's official website ruv.is.

Format 
Twenty-four songs in total competed in Söngvakeppni Sjónvarpsins 2006 where the winner was determined after three semi-finals and a final. Eight songs competed in each semi-final on 21 January, 28 January and 4 February 2006. The top four songs from each semi-final qualified to the final which took place on 3 February 2007. The results of the semi-finals and final were determined by 100% public televoting, while two wildcard acts were selected by a jury for the final out of the fifth-placed acts from each of the semi-finals. All songs were required to be performed in Icelandic during all portions of the competition, however, it will be up to the winning composers to decide the language that will be performed at the Eurovision Song Contest in Athens.

Competing entries 
On 30 October 2005, RÚV opened the submission period for interested songwriters to submit their entries until the deadline on 18 November 2005. Songwriters were required to be Icelandic or possess Icelandic citizenship. At the close of the submission deadline, 226 entries were received. A selection committee was formed in order to select the top twenty-four entries. The twenty-four competing songs were revealed by the broadcaster during a press conference on 13 December 2005, while their artists were revealed on 16, 17 and 20 January 2006. Among the competing artists were previous Icelandic Eurovision entrants Gunnar Ólason, who represented Iceland in 2001 as part of Two Tricky, and Birgitta Haukdal, who represented Iceland in 2003.

Shows

Semi-finals
The three semi-finals took place on 21 January, 28 January and 4 February 2006. In each semi-final eight acts presented their entries, and the top four entries voted upon solely by public televoting proceeded to the final. "Sést það ekki á mér?" performed by Matthías Matthíasson and "Flottur karl, Sæmi rokk" performed by Magni Ásgeirsson were awarded the jury wildcards and also proceeded to the final. "Til hamingju Ísland" performed by Silvía Nótt directly qualified to compete in the final due to online leaks of the song prior to the competition, but still performed in the third semi-final.

Final
The final took place on 18 February 2006 where the fifteen entries that qualified from the preceding three semi-finals competed. The winner, "Til hamingju Ísland" performed Silvía Nótt, was determined solely by televoting. In addition to the performances of the competing artists, the interval acts featured guest performances by 1985 Eurovision Song Contest winner Bobbysocks!, who won for Norway with the song "La det swinge", and 1997 Icelandic Eurovision entrant Páll Óskar.

At Eurovision
According to Eurovision rules, all nations with the exceptions of the host country, the "Big Four" (France, Germany, Spain and the United Kingdom) and the ten highest placed finishers in the 2005 contest are required to qualify from the semi-final in order to compete for the final; the top ten countries from the semi-final progress to the final. On 21 March 2006, a special allocation draw was held which determined the running order for the semi-final, to be held on 18 May 2006, and the final, to be held on 20 May 2006. Iceland was drawn to perform last in position 23, following the entry from Bosnia and Herzegovina. On 30 April 2006, it was announced that "Til hamingju Ísland" would be performed in English at the Eurovision Song Contest and would be titled "Congratulations". At the end of the semi-final, Iceland was not announced among the top 10 entries in the semi-final and therefore failed to qualify to compete in the final. Silvía Night was also booed off the stage following her performance. It was later revealed that the Iceland placed thirteenth in the semi-final, receiving a total of 62 points.

The semi-final and the final were broadcast in Iceland on RÚV with commentary by Sigmar Guðmundsson. The Icelandic spokesperson, who announced the Icelandic votes during the final, was Ragnhildur Steinunn Jónsdóttir.

Voting 
Below is a breakdown of points awarded to Iceland and awarded by Iceland in the semi-final and grand final of the contest. The nation awarded its 12 points to Finland in the semi-final and the final of the contest.

Points awarded to Iceland

Points awarded by Iceland

Controversy 
Silvía Night's participation in the Eurovision Song Contest brought with it several moments of controversy, particularly over the lyrics of the English version of the song. The European Broadcasting Union (EBU) threatened to disqualify the entry due to the line "the vote is in, I'll fucking win" being used in the song. The contest's Executive supervisor Svante Stockselius formally informed the Icelandic delegation that the lyrics as written were in violation of the rules, however Silvía claimed at her press conferences that she would "fucking say what I fucking want". One set of lyrics published online featured the line "they say I win", prior to the formal objection being lodged.

Over the course of the rehearsals, Silvía continued to perform the lyrics as originally written. Her second dress rehearsal also featured abuse of the floor manager, whom she called a "fucking retard". Eventually however the swear word was dropped for the live performance during the semi-final, with the line replaced by "the vote is in, I'll freaking win".

Commentary both before and after Silvía's performance stressed the fact that she was a television character, rather than a real person. Her entire appearance, therefore, was in fact something of a joke at the expense of the contest – something Silvía herself picked up on when arguing at a press conference that people intending to enter the contest as a joke should not do so.

References

2006
Countries in the Eurovision Song Contest 2006
Eurovision